Amr Nazir Salem (born 1958) is a Syrian politician. He is currently Internal Trade and Consumer Protection Minister in the Second Hussein Arnous government.

Life and career
He was born in Damascus in 1958. He had a PhD in Informatics with management.

1989-1998: participated in the establishment of the Syrian Scientific Informatics Society and was elected in its board of directors 
 2005: advisor to he Presidency of the Republic 
 2006-2007: Minister of Communications and Technology

When he was appointed in 2021, he was sanctioned by the European Union.

See also
Second Hussein Arnous government
Cabinet of Syria

References 

Living people
1958 births
Syrian ministers of communication
Syrian ministers of internal trade
21st-century Syrian politicians
People from Damascus
Government ministers of Syria